Abiola Peter Makinde born (16 August 1976) is a financial management expert and politician. He is a member of Nigeria Federal House of Representatives holding assignment for  Ondo East/Ondo West federal constituency  of  Nigeria's western state of Ondo.  In 2014, President Goodluck Jonathan appointed Makinde National Board Member of Nigeria Literacy Commission and was on the assignment until 2015 when President Jonathan and People's Democratic Party, PDP lost federal power to then opposition All Progressives Congress, APC.

Makinde is a grass root politician and is known for his populist political ideology. He is recognised as empowering the poor and advocating for improved and equal opportunities for the youth earning a nickname “ Father of empowerment” for himself . in 2019,  Makinde and his wife, Rhoda  were awarded Honorary Doctorate Degree in Business Administration  by Global Oved Dei Seminary and University, Florida, USA.

Family background and education 
Makinde was born to Chief  Ambrose Boluwaji Makinde.  His great grandfather Lisa Akinrinde  was a High Chief and Baale with several villages and districts under his control.  Makinde attended primary and secondary schools in Nigeria's commercial city of Lagos. After his Secondary education, he enrolled in Ondo State Polytechnic (now Rufus Giwa Polytechnic), Owo for National Diploma. In 2000, Makinde enrolled for some preliminary courses in Northern Virginia Community College, USA and was later admitted to the University of Maryland, University College, USA where he graduated with a bachelor's degree in Computer Information system in 2006. He holds a master's degree in Financial Management from University of Maryland, University college, USA (2009).

Political career

Caretaker Chairman 
In 2013, Governor Olusegun Mimiko appointed Makinde Caretaker Chairman of Ondo West Local Government. He was in that position until 2015. During his term as caretaker chairman, Dr. Abiola Makinde was awarded the best performing Local Government Council Chairman. The event took place  in Abuja in 2015. Makinde sponsored five youths of his native Ondo west Local Government area to India for a training in processing of bamboo into finished products.  His  political popularity started from here as his community development and empowerment programmes brought him closer to the grass root people. It was here he earned the nickname “father of empowerment”.

Election to Nigeria's  House of Representatives 
Makinde in 2014 emerged Publicity Secretary of the Peoples’ Democratic Party, PDP South-west zone  of Nigeria upgrading his political profile to a regional politician. But left the party in the buildup to the 2019 Nigeria's general polls after crisis erupted in the party. He defected to a newly registered low profile political party, African Democratic Congress, ADC to pursue his ambition to take the seat of  Ondo East/West federal constituency in the Nigeria's Federal House of Representatives. Makinde campaign rallies recorded huge crowds of supporters. He caused a major political upset with his victory at the polls against two major political parties, the ruling All Progressives Congress and his former party, PDP.

Makinde of the ADC polled  19,083 votes to defeat his two major challengers,  Ajibayo John Adeyeye of the ruling APC  with 11,935 and the PDP's candidate, Adeduro Charles Adeyemi with 9,929 votes.

Just recently, with the support of other members of the National Assembly, he facilitated the bill for the upgrade of Adeyemi College of Education to a Federal University of Education. The bill was successfully approved by the President.

References

External links 
 Ondo East/West 2019 House Reps Election Results

Peoples Democratic Party (Nigeria) politicians
People from Ondo State
1976 births
Yoruba people
Northern Virginia Community College alumni
Living people